State Route 183 is a primary state highway in the U.S. state of Virginia. Known as Occohannock Neck Road, the state highway runs  from SR 613 and SR 709 in Jamesville east to U.S. Route 13 Business (US 13 Business) in Exmore in northern Northampton County.

Route description

SR 183 begins at an intersection with SR 613 and SR 709 in Jamesville. Occohannock Neck Road continues south along SR 613 to Silver Beach. The state highway heads northeast and east as a two-lane undivided road along the spine of Occohannock Neck, which lies between the Chesapeake Bay to the west and Nassawadox Creek to the south and east. SR 183 passes through the hamlet of Wardtown and has a pair of sharp curves before entering the town of Exmore just west of its intersection with US 13 (Lankford Highway). The state highway reaches its eastern terminus at US 13 Business (Main Street) in the center of the town, two blocks south of the southern terminus of SR 178.

Major intersections

References

External links

Virginia Highways Project: VA 183

183
State Route 183